The Victorian Chaise-Longue (1953) is a novella by the English novelist Marghanita Laski. Published in 1953, the book describes the experience of an invalided young woman who wakes up in the body of her alter-ego eighty years previously.

It was republished in 1999 by Persephone Books.

Reception
The New York Times reviewer Kenneth Fearing praised the story as "a subdued, evenly paced nightmare."  Writing in F&SF, Anthony Boucher described The Victorian Chaise Longue as "an admirably written book, highly skilled in its economic evocation of time, place and character - and a relentlessly terrifying one." P. Schuyler Miller placed the "slight but beautifully written" novella on "the borderlands of fantasy and science fiction."

Television
Two adaptations of the story were produced for American television. The first, in 1957, starred Joan Fontaine and appeared on the Ronald Reagan-hosted General Electric Theater. The second, starring Frances White, appeared as an episode of Studio 4 in the United Kingdom in 1962.

References

External links
The Victorian Chaise-Longue at Persephone Books

1953 British novels
English novels
British novellas
Cresset Press books